A. celebensis may refer to:

Ambulyx celebensis, a moth species
Amplypterus celebensis, a moth species
Antheraea celebensis, a moth species